Coleophora synchrona is a moth of the family Coleophoridae. It is found in Kazakhstan, Turkmenistan and Iran.

The larvae feed on the leaves of Lycium kopetdaghi and Lycium gasystemum.

References

synchrona
Moths of Asia
Moths described in 1988